The Dominican Summer League (DSL) is a branch of affiliated Minor League Baseball which is played in the Dominican Republic. The league was founded in 1985. After the demise of the Venezuelan Summer League after the 2015 season, it is the only Latin America-based rookie league.

Teams in the DSL are owned and operated by Major League Baseball (MLB) franchises. The league's season typically begins in June, with each team playing a 72-game schedule, and ends in late August. The division winners advance to the playoffs. The two division champions with the best winning percentages receive byes to the semifinals.

The start of the 2020 season was delayed due to the COVID-19 pandemic, with the season being cancelled entirely on June 30. The start of the 2021 season was delayed until July 12, with the season ultimately concluding on October 2 with no postseason; a total of 46 teams competed in six divisions.

Current teams

For the 2021 season, 29 of the 30 MLB franchises fielded at least one farm team in the DSL; the Atlanta Braves did not field a team. All DSL teams are named after their parent clubs (e.g. DSL Twins). Seventeen MLB franchises fielded two teams in the league; such squads are usually differentiated by suffixes (e.g. Blue and Red, or 1 and 2), although the Colorado Rockies named their teams "Colorado" and "Rockies". The 46 total teams were organized into six divisions; five divisions with eight teams and one division (Baseball City) with six teams. There is no correlation between MLB divisions and DSL divisions; DSL divisions have a mix of teams from American League and National League parent clubs.

Source:

DSL teams per MLB franchise

Playoff procedure
As of 2022, eight teams—six division winners and two wild card teams—qualify for the playoffs seeded by winning percentage regardless of division standing. All postseason series are in best-of-three format.

Champions

See also

Dominican Summer League rosters

Notes

References

Further reading

External links
Official website 

DSL Encyclopedia and History at Baseball-Reference.com

 
Baseball competitions in the Dominican Republic
Latin American baseball leagues
Minor league baseball leagues
Sports leagues established in 1985
1985 establishments in the Dominican Republic